Sukhdehri Kalan is a village located in Mohammadabad tehsil of Ghazipur district, Uttar Pradesh. It has total 110 families residing. Sukhdehri has population of 958 as per Population Census 2011.

Administration
Sukhdehri Kalan village is administrated by Pradhan who is elected representative of village as per constitution of India and Panchyati Raaj Act.

References

External links
Villages in Ghazipur  Uttar Pradesh

Villages in Ghazipur district